Redbird Smith (born To-Juwah Sequanitah, Cherokee) (1850–1918) was a traditionalist and political activist in the Cherokee Nation in Indian Territory. He helped found the Nighthawk Keetoowah Society, whose members revitalized traditional spirituality among the Cherokee from the mid-19th century to the early 20th century.

Early life
Redbird Smith was born into a Cherokee family on July 19, 1850 in Indian Territory, near the current city of Fort Smith, Arkansas. His father was Pig Redbird Smith, who was given his surname by European Americans, after they noted that he worked as a blacksmith. Redbird Smith's mother was Lizzie (Hildebrand) Smith. His parents had been removed from Georgia to Indian Territory. Both his parents were ardent traditionalists. When Redbird Smith was ten, his "father dedicated him to the services and cause of the Cherokee people in accordance with ancient customs and usages."

Political activism
In the late 19th century the Dawes Commission was established under the Dawes Act. It was ordered to carry out registration of members of Indian tribes, in order to identify heads of households for the allotments of communal lands to individual families. This was to be a means to convert Native Americans to the European-American model of subsistence farming. Any lands remaining after such allotment were to be declared "surplus", and the United States government would put them up for sale, including to non-natives. Redbird Smith led a political resistance movement to the Dawes Allotment Act and sought to return to traditional Cherokee religious nationalism and values.

In 1887 and 1889, Smith served as a tribal councilor from the Illinois District of the Cherokee Nation.

Smith said in the early 1900s: 

Smith repatriated wampum belts belonging to his tribe. In 1910 he was selected as chief of the Nighthawk Keetoowahs. Previously he had served as their chairman. Also in 1910, Smith and fellow Nighthawks traveled to Mexico with an 1820 document supporting Cherokee lands claims from when bands had lived there, but the Mexican government did not support their claims. In 1914, he petitioned President Woodrow Wilson to create a Keetoowah reservation, but the US government rejected the idea, believing that reservations hindered its assimilation policy for Native Americans. In 1921, one hundred Cherokee from 35 families moved together to the southeastern corner of Cherokee County, Oklahoma, to create a traditional community. This was "the brainchild of Redbird Smith."

Family
Redbird Smith married Lucy Fields, born in Braggs, Indian Territory in 1852. She was the daughter of Richard Fields and Eliza (née Brewer) Fields. Together the Smiths had ten children who survived into adulthood, including eight sons and two daughters.

Among their descendants is great-grandson Chad Smith, former Principal Chief of the Cherokee Nation.

Death and legacy
After falling ill for 48 hours, Redbird Smith died on November 8, 1918. He is buried in the Redbird Smith Cemetery in Sequoyah County, Oklahoma.

He served as chief of the Nighthawk Keetoowahs until his death and was succeeded for a short period by Levi Gritts. His son Sam Smith became chief of the Nighthawk Keetowahs on April 7, 1919.

The Redbirth Smith ground is an active ceremonial ground. Redbird Smith, Oklahoma, Sequoyah County, was named for him. Smith's birthday on July 19 is celebrated annually at the ceremonial ground.

See also
Original Keetoowah Society
Stomp dance

Notes

References
 Conley, Robert. "The Dawes Commission and Redbird Smith." The Cherokee Nation: A History. Albuquerque: University of New Mexico Press, 2005: 193-199. .
 Starr, Emmet. History of the Cherokee Indians and Their Legends and Folklore. Oklahoma City: The Warden Company, 1921.

External links
Redbird Smith, on the Cherokee Nation website
Red Bird Smith and the Keetoowah Society, Access Genealogy

                   

1850 births
1918 deaths
People from Sebastian County, Arkansas
People from Ellis County, Texas
Native American activists
19th-century Native American politicians
20th-century Native American politicians
Cherokee Nation politicians (1794–1907)
Cherokee Nation politicians
Religious figures of the indigenous peoples of North America
Activists from Texas
Native American people from Arkansas